Martin Maiden (born Southampton, UK,  20 May 1957) is Statutory Professor of the Romance Languages at the University of Oxford and a Fellow of Trinity College, Oxford. He was educated at King Edward VI School, Southampton, and then at Trinity Hall, University of Cambridge, where he received a BA in Modern and Medieval Languages in 1980 and a PhD in Linguistics in 1987 (doctoral thesis:  Metaphony and the Italian dialects: a study in morphologisation). Before going to Oxford in 1996, he taught Italian at the University of Bath (1982-1989) and subsequently became a lecturer in Romance Philology at the University of Cambridge (1989-1996), where he was a Fellow of Downing College. He has been a Fellow of the British Academy since 2003. He holds an honorary doctorate from the University of Bucharest (2013), and in 2014 was appointed to the rank of ‘Commander’ in Ordinul Național “Serviciul Credincios”’ (the Romanian ‘National Order for “Faithful Service”’). In 2018 he was elected a Member of Academia Europaea and in 2019 he was made an Honorary Fellow of Downing College Cambridge. In 2019 he was also appointed Membro corrispondente of the Italian Accademia della Crusca.

Maiden specializes in the history and structure of the Romance languages, especially varieties of Romanian, Dalmatian, Italian and other Italo-Romance dialects, historical linguistics, morphology, and dialectology. He has published over 100 articles and book chapters, and edited or authored several books, in these areas and the grammar of Italian. He has also co-edited volumes on morphological theory with reference to Romance languages.

Selected major works (Maiden is also a contributor to all of the edited volumes cited)

1991 Interactive Morphonology. Metaphony in Italy. London: Routledge.

1995 A Linguistic History of Italian. London: Longman.

1997 (edited with M. Parry) The Dialects of Italy. London: Routledge.

1998 Storia linguistica dell’italiano, Bologna: il Mulino.

2007 (with C. Robustelli) A Reference Grammar of Modern Italian. London: Hodder Arnold.

2011 (edited with J. C. Smith and A. Ledgeway) The Cambridge History of the Romance Languages I Structures. Cambridge: CUP.

2011 (edited with J. C. Smith, M. Goldbach and M.-O. Hinzelin) Morphological Autonomy. Perspectives from Romance Inflectional Morphology. Oxford: OUP.

2013 (edited with J. C. Smith and A. Ledgeway) The Cambridge History of the Romance Languages II Contexts. Cambridge: CUP.

2016 (edited with A. Ledgeway) The Oxford Guide to the Romance Languages. Oxford: OUP.

2018 The Romance Verb. Morphomic Structure and Diachrony. Oxford: Oxford University Press.

2020 (edited with S. Wolfe) Variation and Change in Gallo-Romance Grammar. Oxford: OUP

2021 (with A. Dragomirescu, G. Pană Dindelegan, O. Uță Bărbulescu, and R. Zafiu) The Oxford History of Romanian Morphology. Oxford: OUP

2022 (edited with A. Ledgeway) The Cambridge Handbook of Romance Linguistics. Cambridge: CUP

References

Alumni of the University of Cambridge
Linguists from England
Living people
1957 births
Fellows of the British Academy